Ervin Plány (16 April 1885 in Budapest – 5 January 1916 in Budapest) was a Hungarian painter who was exhibited by the Ernst Museum following his death, having served as its secretary during his life. During World War I he was fatally wounded and died after being evacuated to Budapest.

Sources

1885 births
1916 deaths
Artists from Budapest
Austro-Hungarian military personnel killed in World War I
20th-century Hungarian painters
Hungarian male painters
20th-century Hungarian male artists